Fanyana Mokoena, previously Fanyana Dhladhla, (born 11 November 1978 in Nigel, Gauteng) is a South African association football winger and striker.

External links
Player's profile at absapremiership.co.za

1978 births
South African soccer players
Living people
Association football midfielders
Association football forwards
Free State Stars F.C. players
Mamelodi Sundowns F.C. players
Maritzburg United F.C. players